"You've Got a Friend" is a 1971 song written and originally performed by Carole King.

You've Got a Friend may also refer to:

Music
 You've Got a Friend (Andy Williams album), 1971
 You've Got a Friend (Susie Luchsinger album), 2003
 You've Got a Friend (Johnny Mathis album), 1971
 "You've Got a Friend" (Sonia and Big Fun song), 1990

Television
 You've Got a Friend (TV program), a 2004 reality television program that aired on MTV

See also
 "You've Got a Friend in Me", a 1995 song by Randy Newman